San Saba can refer to:

Places

Italy
San Saba, Rome, a church in Rome, Italy
San Saba, Lazio, a rione in the City of Rome

United States
San Saba, Texas, a town in Texas, USA
San Saba County, Texas, a county in Texas, USA
San Saba River, a river in Texas
 Mission Santa Cruz de San Sabá, one of the Spanish missions in Texas

Other
 San Saba (film), a 2008 film starring Angus Macfadyen and Elisabeth Röhm